Maihan TV (Persian: تلویزیون میهن) is a television network channel in Herat, Afghanistan.

See also 
 Television in Afghanistan

References

External links 
 www.maihantv.com

Television in Afghanistan
Persian-language television stations